Borat Subsequent Moviefilm: Delivery of Prodigious Bribe to American Regime for Make Benefit Once Glorious Nation of Kazakhstan (also stylized as BORДT SUBSEQUEИT MOVIEFILM, or simply Borat Subsequent Moviefilm or Borat 2) is a 2020 mockumentary directed by Jason Woliner (in his feature directorial debut). The film stars Sacha Baron Cohen as the fictional Kazakh journalist and television personality Borat Sagdiyev, and Maria Bakalova as his daughter Tutar, who is to be offered as a bride to then-U.S. vice president Mike Pence during the COVID-19 pandemic and the 2020 presidential election. It is a sequel to 2006's Borat: Cultural Learnings of America for Make Benefit Glorious Nation of Kazakhstan.

Although BaronCohen had said in 2007 that he had retired the Borat character, he was spotted in 2019 in the disguise, and was seen filming in mid-2020, leading to speculation of a second Borat film. The project was officially announced in September 2020, with Amazon Studios acquiring the distribution rights. Borat Subsequent Moviefilm was released on October23, 2020, on Amazon Prime Video. It received praise from critics for BaronCohen and Bakalova's performances, as well as for its commentary on American culture, however polarized on former New York City mayor Rudy Giuliani’s performance. The film received three nominations at the 78th Golden Globe Awards, winning for Best Actor – Motion Picture Musical or Comedy for Baron Cohen and Best Motion Picture – Musical or Comedy. At the 93rd Academy Awards, it was nominated for Best Adapted Screenplay and Best Supporting Actress for Bakalova. In addition, Bakalova was nominated for Best Actress — Motion Picture Comedy or Musical at the Golden Globes and received nominations for Outstanding  Performance by a Female Actor in a Supporting Role and Best Actress in a Supporting Role at the 27th Screen Actors Guild Awards and 74th British Academy Film Awards. The screenplay won at the 73rd Writers Guild of America Awards.

Plot
After fourteen years of forced labor in a gulag for the dishonor inflicted on his country in his previous adventure, Kazakh journalist Borat Sagdiyev is released by his country's president, Nursultan Nazarbayev, with a mission to deliver Kazakh Minister of Culture (and Kazakhstan's most famous porn actor) Johnny the Monkey to President Donald Trump in an attempt to redeem the nation. Unable to get close to Trump after defecating in the landscaping of Trump International Hotel and Tower in the previous film, Borat opts to give the monkey to Vice President Mike Pence. Before leaving, he discovers that his arch nemesis neighbor, Nursultan Tulyakbay, has stolen his family and home, and that he has a fifteen-year-old daughter, Tutar, who lives in his barn.

Borat is transported across the world in a circuitous route by cargo ship and arrives in Galveston, Texas, where he finds he is a celebrity. Wanting to maintain a low profile, Borat purchases multiple disguises. He buys a cell phone and goes to welcome Johnny, but finds that Tutar is in Johnny's shipping crate and has eaten him. Horrified, Borat faxes Nazarbayev, who tells him to find a way to satisfy Pence or he will be executed. Borat decides to give Tutar to Pence.

Tutar receives a makeover and Borat introduces her at a debutante ball. At the ball, her menstrual blood is prominently displayed during a father and daughter dance. Discovering that Pence is nearby at CPAC, Borat disguises himself as Trump and attempts to give Tutar to him there, but is ejected by security. Nazarbayev is enraged and tells him to return to Kazakhstan for execution. Realizing that he can still give Tutar to someone close to Trump, Tutar suggests giving her to Rudy Giuliani.

Because Giuliani had bragged about having an affair with a large-breasted woman, Borat brings Tutar to a cosmetic surgeon who advises breast implants. While Borat works in a barbershop to raise enough money to pay for breast surgery, he briefly leaves Tutar with a babysitter who is confused by Borat's sexist teachings. She informs Tutar that the things her culture has taught her are lies. After Tutar sees a woman driving a car, and successfully masturbates for the first time, she decides not to get the surgery and lashes out at Borat for keeping her oppressed her whole life. Before leaving, she tells him the Holocaust, their country’s "greatest accomplishment" is a lie by citing a Holocaust denial Facebook page.

Shaken, Borat decides to commit suicide by going to the nearest synagogue dressed as his version of a stereotypical Jew and waiting for the next shooting, but is shocked to find Holocaust survivors there who treat him with kindness, and to his anti-Semitic delight, reassure him that the Holocaust happened. Overjoyed, Borat goes looking for Tutar, but finds the streets deserted due to the COVID-19 pandemic. He quarantines with two QAnon conspiracy theorists who offer to help him reunite with Tutar. They find Tutar online, who has become a reporter and will be covering a March for Our Rights rally in Olympia, Washington.

At the rally, the men appeal to Tutar, telling her that her dad will be killed unless she helps. She accepts and arranges an interview to seduce Giuliani, but without her father's participation. Borat talks with her babysitter and has a change of heart, realizing that he loves Tutar. After the interview, Giuliani and Tutar proceed to a bedroom before Borat intervenes and tries to personally offer sexual favors to Giuliani. Borat decides to face execution in Kazakhstan and Tutar promises to go with him.

Borat is shocked to find he will not be executed as he had instead been used as retaliation by Nazarbayev for making Kazakhstan a laughingstock. Before departing for the United States, Kazakhstan officials infected Borat with SARS-CoV-2 via an injection of "gypsy tears", making him patient zero of the COVID-19 pandemic. As he was sent around the world, he continued to spread the virus. Borat uses a recording made near the beginning of his trip to convince Nazarbayev that his admission has been recorded and sent to Brian, the man who sold Borat his phone, and whom Borat claims is America's Minister of Technology.

Borat and Tutar blackmail Nazarbayev into giving him his job back and changing Kazakhstan's misogynistic laws. Three months later, Tutar and Borat are a reporting team and Kazakhstan has a new tradition to replace the nation's antisemitic ones: the Running of the American. It features exaggerated caricatures of Trump supporters and "Karens" pretending to spread COVID-19 and killing an effigy of Anthony Fauci. The film ends with a message encouraging viewers to vote in the then-upcoming presidential election.

Cast
 Sacha Baron Cohen as Borat Margaret Sagdiyev, a Kazakh news reporter who has achieved international fame and notoriety after the release of his "documentary", and who has been imprisoned in Kazakhstan for the past 14 years for being perceived to have brought shame to the country.
 Maria Bakalova as Tutar Sagdiyev, Borat's teenage daughter. Bakalova was initially credited as Irina Nowak but later reports revealed Bakalova's involvement.
 Dani Popescu as Premier Nursultan Nazarbayev, a fictionalized version of Kazakhstan's leader of the same name.
Tom Hanks as himself
Manuel Vieru as Dr. Yamak, who injеcts Borat with COVID-19, making him patient zero in the pandemic
Miroslav Tolj as Nursultan Tulyakbay, Borat's hated neighbor who steals his family and property while Borat is in prison
Alin Popa as Hueylewis / Jeffrey Epstein Sagdiyev, Borat's son. Popa replaced Stonie from the first film.
Ion Gheorghe as Bilak Sagdiyev, Borat's son
Nicolae Gheorghe as Biram Sagdiyev, Borat's son
Marcela Codrea as a Kuczek villager
Luca Nelu as a Kuczek villager
Nicoleta Ciobanu as Babuska
Rita Wilson as herself
Jason Woliner as a bystander in Australia

Mike Pence and Rudy Giuliani appear as themselves. Bystanders included in the film include salesman Brian Patrick Snyder, Instagram influencer and entertainer Macy Chanel, crisis pregnancy center owner Pastor Jonathan Bright, debutante coach Dr. Jean Sheffield, Dallas-based plastic surgeon and naval reservist Charles Wallace, professional babysitter Jeanise Jones, Wooten's Barbershop (Eatonton, Georgia) patron Alan "Randy" Knight, the Hillsborough Republican Women's Club, QAnon conspiracy theorists Jerry Holleman and Jim Russell, and Holocaust survivor Judith Dim Evans. The character of Johnny the Monkey—a porn star and Kazakhstani government minister—was given a fictionalized backstory as a famous monkey actor.

Sid Miller, Donald Trump, and Donald Trump Jr. were originally in the film, but their scenes were cut. Comedian Luenell was filmed as the character Luenell, the prostitute who marries Borat at the end of the first film, but her scenes were also cut.

Production

Development
Rupert Murdoch announced in early February 2007 that BaronCohen had signed on to do another Borat film with 20th Century Fox, distributor of the first film. BaronCohen later claimed that Borat was to be discontinued, as he was now too well known to avoid detection as he did in the film and on Da Ali G Show. A spokesman for Fox later stated that it was too early to begin planning such a film, although they were open to the idea. In 2014, he brought back Borat for the FXX series AliG: Rezurection, a compilation of the sketches from Da AliG Show with new footage. He also briefly appeared as Borat in December2015 on an episode of Jimmy Kimmel Live! to promote the film Grimsby and again in November2018 to encourage Americans to vote in that year's midterm elections. In the two years leading up to the release, the film's star became more concerned about being politically active, giving speeches and interviews in-person to combat racism; he insisted on releasing the film immediately before the 2020 presidential election to provoke alarm among Americans about a slide into illiberal democracy.

Like several of Sacha BaronCohen's films, the score is composed by his brother Erran Baron Cohen, in addition to other original recordings by Romanian Balkan band Fanfare Ciocărlia and their version of "Just the Two of Us"; Canadian roots musician Adrian Raso performing "Urn St.Tavern".

Filming

Filming did not begin until Tutar was cast; Bakalova was chosen for the role among 600 actresses who auditioned. She initially sent in a tape of her acting for an unnamed Hollywood movie she suspected may have been a human trafficking scam, but she ended up going to London to rehearse with BaronCohen, convincing her that this was a real opportunity. Ken Davitian, who portrayed Azamat Bagatov in the first Borat, was offered the opportunity to reprise his role, but did not sign on because the producers would not tell him that the film was a Borat sequel. An early prank filmed in late 2019 involved a farcical interview with Texas Agriculture Commissioner Sid Miller, followed by a trip to an Arlington, Texas driving range; the scenes were cut from the film but appear in the trailer. In February2020, BaronCohen was spotted dressed up as Donald Trump, interrupting the Conservative Political Action Conference (CPAC), although his true identity was not revealed at the time.

That same month, BaronCohen traveled to Macon, Georgia, to trick attendees of a fake debutante ball, telling the organizers at the Johnston–Felton–Hay House that he was filming a coming-of-age story. He was briefly pulled over by a police officer for having Bakalova riding on the roof of his vehicle; body cam footage clearly shows he was identified as himself the comedian, as opposed to his character. The crew also attended Marietta-based Temple Kol Emeth to film the scenes with Evans. The production made at least two visits to upstate South Carolina to film at a bakery, crisis pregnancy center, and Halloween supply store. On 27 June 2020, Cohen performed pranks at a gun rally in Olympia, Washington, leading attendees to sing along with racist lyrics to an original song, and interviewed members of the crowd. When demonstrators picketing the rally recognized BaronCohen and began laughing, the crowd and organizers realized they were being pranked and quickly turned violent, but were slowed from storming the stage as security had been hired by the Borat team. Eventually, BaronCohen and his crew were forced to flee in a private ambulance, with BaronCohen having to physically hold the door shut as members of the crowd tried to break in. News media quickly learned about the prank but speculated it was for a new season of Who Is America? On 7 July2020, BaronCohen arranged a fake interview with Rudy Giuliani, only to burst in during the conversation wearing a pink bikini; Giuliani called the police.

The following month, he was spotted in Los Angeles dressed as Borat and filming, leading to speculation from the public that BaronCohen's next project was a Borat sequel. On two days of filming BaronCohen was required to wear a bulletproof vest due to the possible threats of the scene.

In early September2020, rumors began to circulate claiming that the film was completely shot, assembled, and screened for film industry executives; the title was originally leaked as Borat2: Great Success and then Borat: Gift of Pornographic Monkey to Vice Premiere Mikhael Pence to Make Benefit Recently Diminished Nation of Kazakhstan, where the latter was used as one of the title cards. On September20, a prank involving Bakalova infiltrating the White House and being interviewed by Chanel Rion of One America News Network was filmed but cut from the final release. The village sequences set in Kazakhstan were shot in Romania but not the same village as the previous film after negative feedback from the villagers. Romanian actors were hired for a few parts.

The film was shot on 72 different cameras, including both high-end cinema cameras and smartphones. The production utilized simple codecs to mimic the look of the original movie. The Arri Amira and Alexa Mini were the A, B, and C cameras, accompanied by lesser cameras for hidden, robotic, and low profile applications, including iPhones.

Release
In September2020, Amazon Studios acquired distribution rights to the film for $80 million, and scheduled it for an October23 release. The film was originally going to be released theatrically by Universal Pictures after a negative pickup deal between Universal and Baron Cohen. Since Baron Cohen wanted the film to be seen by the widest audience possible before the elections and Universal was at odds with theater chains over its release of Trolls World Tour in PVOD, while theatrical box office was showing weak numbers during the COVID-19 pandemic, as a PVOD release would required a separate transaction between Universal and Baron Cohen, Baron Cohen and Universal agreed to look for potential buyers for the film in streaming services. BaronCohen presented the movie to several streamers who were not willing to release it due to its political content. With the deal with Amazon Studios, Universal was repaid by its outlay and Baron Cohen was compensated in a manner he would have had Universal released the film theatrically. The first trailer was released on October 1, 2020, confirming that several of BaronCohen's pranks were shot for this film.

Promotion and marketing
In the two weeks leading up to the film release, Amazon spent $20.4million on marketing.

BaronCohen joined social media outlets Instagram, TikTok, and Twitter in-character as Borat to comment on American politics in the run-up to the election and promote the film release, including congratulating Donald Trump for winning the first of the 2020 United States presidential debates before the event began and starting a "feud" with Ariana Grande for stealing a cut-out of Borat installed at a drive-in theater. The social media push also involved a Twitch stream playing video games with DrLupo and meeting YouTube influencers. He also made a return to Jimmy Kimmel Live! in character a few days before the film's release.

Amazon Prime UK promoted the film by projecting an image of Borat in an extremely small mankini resembling a face mask on the side of several historic sites in Scotland. In Australia's Bondi Beach, 40Borat look-alikes descended onto the sands to do a yoga class in the "maskini" gear, accompanied by a large statue. During the second presidential debate, Baron Cohen hosted a watch party to debut the film in-character, followed by an afterparty made up of dance music and questions from fans via a live chat. A further stunt involved a large inflatable Borat floating in a barge along the Toronto waterfront and in front of London's Palace of Westminster. The Cerne Abbas Giant was also defaced with a mask and the slogan "WEAR MASK. SAVE LIVE".

Amazon additionally collaborated with YouTube pranksters to trick Stephen Bear, Jimmy Carr, Perrie Edwards, David Spade, David Walliams, and Ann Widdecombe into a false audition for a third Borat film, convincing them to act as a Kazakhstani ambassador. The company also modified their Alexa service to give potato news from Borat.

Reception

Critical response

The site's critics consensus reads: "Borat Subsequent Moviefilm proves Sacha BaronCohen's comedic creation remains a sharp tool for exposing the most misguided—or outright repugnant—corners of American culture." Most publications said the film received generally positive reviews, though the BBC and Reuters summed up the critical consensus as "mixed".

Eric Kohn of IndieWire gave the film an A− and wrote: "Fourteen years after his last romp, Borat isn't exactly woke, but his time has come: This searing brand of humor has never felt more essential. Blending activism with entertainment, BaronCohen's best movie to date gives us new reasons to be afraid of the world, but also permission to laugh at it." Richard Roeper of the Chicago Sun-Times gave the film three out of four stars and wrote: "Fourteen years after Kazakhstan journalist Borat came to America to make a documentary about our great nation, he's back in the USA—older, dumber, far more famous and arguably even more politically incorrect and offensively funny than he was in 2006."

In The Guardian, Peter Bradshaw gave the film three out of five stars, saying "there are still some real laughs and pointed political moments" but that it "overstays its welcome". Jesse Hassenger of The A.V. Club gave the film a B− and called it "frequently funny and occasionally pointed" but "also another instance where doing things as they've always been done no longer feels like quite enough". Similarly, Devika Girish of The New York Times notes how the sequel is not as shocking or insightful as the first film, summing up, "[the] elaborate ruses of Borat Subsequent Moviefilm left me neither entertained nor enraged, but simply resigned".

In a review for The Daily Telegraph, Robbie Collin awarded the film two of five stars, calling the film "despairingly threadbare" and "a string of half-formed, recycled and disjointed pranks you suspect wouldn't have survived the quality-control process on the original, effortfully connected post hoc by largely uninspired scripted scenes." Longtime Chicago Tribune film columnist Michael Philips gave the film two stars, calling the sequel "ruder" and "more sentimental" than its predecessor. Phillips summarized his reaction as having "laughed at a good deal of the movie, but a good deal more of it left [him] with (Cohen's  intention, probably) the taste of ashes in the mouth". Alonso Duralde of The Wrap negatively reviewed the movie, believing it "valiantly fails to resuscitate the satire corpse". Duralde, a self-avowed "superfan" of the first film, writes that "the sequel might (in, one hopes, a happier future) be hilarious in retrospect, but at the moment, it's a mostly cringe-worthy experience".

Response from Kazakhstan
Unlike the reception of the first Borat movie, which was denounced by the Kazakh state as a libellous smear against the people of Kazakhstan, and resulted in threatened legal action against Cohen and his distributors, the release of the sequel received a more mixed reception. The Kazakh American Association denounced the film for promoting racism, cultural appropriation and xenophobia. On the other hand, the tourism board of Kazakhstan has appropriated a key catchphrase, "very nice", to promote the advantages of visiting Kazakhstan, capitalizing on the increased public interest in Kazakhstan as a result of the first film.

Controversies

Rudy Giuliani appearance 

Rudy Giuliani was criticized for his actions in a scene in which he appears to slide his hand into the top of his trousers in front of actress Maria Bakalova, who is impersonating a journalist. Following an interview in a hotel room, the pair retreat to the bedroom, where Giuliani's voice is heard (facing away from the camera) asking for an address and phone number. After Bakalova removes his microphone, thus untucking his shirt, Giuliani lies back on the bed and tucks his shirt back in. BaronCohen then bursts into the room exclaiming "She 15! She too old for you!" Giuliani denied allegations of impropriety, claiming that the allegations were a smear for Giuliani's Hunter Biden laptop controversy despite the scene having been filmed months before the controversy occurred.

Controversy over what happened in the scene led BaronCohen to record a brief clip as Borat regarding Giuliani. In an out of character interview, BaronCohen remarked, "Heaven knows what he's done with other female journalists in hotel rooms," and stood by the accuracy of the scene: "It is what it is. He did what he did." While on the campaign trail, Donald Trump called BaronCohen unfunny and "a creep"; BaronCohen subsequently thanked him for the free publicity, saying that he "did not find President Trump funny either". The debate followed Giuliani in subsequent media appearances, such as when Fox News anchor Kennedy confronted him about the scene as well as the veracity of the Biden emails. BaronCohen continued the feud by mocking Giuliani's Four Seasons Total Landscaping press conference and rescinding an earlier job offer to Trump for being a loser in the 2020 United States presidential election.

Accusations of unfair treatment
The film's creators were sued for fraud after including an interview with Holocaust survivor Judith Dim Evans. Evans died before the film's release, but her heirs brought the lawsuit alleging that she did not consent to the commercial use of her likeness in the film. BaronCohen—who dedicated the film to her memory—claimed that he broke character to address Evans's concerns about Borat's anti-Semitic comments, revealing the satirical nature of the piece. The lawsuit was dismissed on October26.

The New York Post reported that babysitter Jeanise Jones felt "betrayed" by the filmmakers who told her that she was going to be in a documentary about a young woman being groomed to marry an older man; she did not find out the true nature of the film until the day before it was released. She later disputed that statement, saying that she was not angry at the filmmakers, and that it was her fault for not reading the release papers. Asked if her $3600 payment for her appearance seemed fair, Jones replied that "I can't say it was fair because they knew it was going to be a movie, and I didn't." Acclaiming her as the "moral compass" of the film and mentioning that she was unemployed as a result of COVID layoffs, a GoFundMe campaign started by Jones' pastor raised over $50,000 for her in three days and more than $150,000 by the end of the week. BaronCohen donated $100,000 to her community of Oklahoma City, with funds disbursed by her church. Jones was cast as an angel in a comedy film as a result of her appearance in Borat Subsequent Moviefilm. Maria Bakalova revealed in January 2021 that she has kept in touch with Jones.

Accusations of racism
The character of Borat has been controversial in Kazakhstan, with the original film being censored for a period and BaronCohen's website blocked in the country. In the lead-up to the sequel, Kazakhstanis took to Twitter with the hashtag #CancelBorat. An online petition urging the film to be canceled garnered over 100,000 signatures and small protests gathered in front of the American embassy in Almaty the day of the premiere. Kazakhs and Westerners alike renewed criticism that the character uses comedy to "punch down" by picking on the more marginalized Kazakhs by arbitrarily mocking their accents and stereotyping them, and the Kazakh American Association issued a letter alleging that the film promotes "racism, cultural appropriation, and xenophobia"; in the lead up to the film awards seasons, they issued a second letter asking organizations to not consider the film. The character has created misperceptions of Kazakhstan. Nevertheless, the national tourism agency Kazakh Tourism capitalized on the renewed international attention the film brought by adopting Borat's catchphrase as its slogan—Kazakhstan. Very Nice!—and produced a number of videos featuring it.

Marketing for the film drew ire from the National Trust for defacing the Cerne Abbas Giant and from Parisian Muslims who objected to posters of the near-nude Borat evidently wearing a ring with "Allah" inscribed on it; the posters were removed.

Audience viewership
Following the film's first weekend, Amazon, Inc. declined to give precise numbers for the number of viewers but stated that it was "tens of millions" globally. Estimates by Samba TV put the number of U.S. households who watched during that first weekend at 1.6 million; Amazon claims these numbers are inaccurate. Based on social media mentions, MarketCast tracked 1.1million hits across the week leading up to and just following the film's release; that left it second only to Hamilton in mentions in 2020. Nielsen ratings for streaming in the week of October19 placed Borat Subsequent Moviefilm at the eighth most-watched program, with 570million minutes, the equivalent to 5.9million viewings. In November, Variety reported the film was the second-most watched straight-to-streaming title of 2020 up to that point.

Miniseries
In April 2021, the follow-up miniseries, Borat 2: Supplemental Reportings featuring deleted scenes from Subsequent Moviefilm was announced. On May 24, 2021, Amazon Prime released the video short Borat: VHS Cassette of Material Deemed 'Sub-acceptable' by Kazakhstan Ministry of Censorship and Circumcision, and seven-episode miniseries, Borat's American Lockdown & Debunking Borat, featuring additional unrelated footage shot during production of Borat Subsequent Moviefilm, including more of his quarantine lockdown with Jim and Jerry. It also features a rare clip of BaronCohen breaking character while still in costume, from when the Borat crew was chased away from the gun rally in Washington: BaronCohen is clearly shown giving warnings to his crew as they evacuate in their hired ambulance.

Future 
In January 2021, Baron Cohen told Variety that there are no plans for a third movie, saying, "There was a purpose to this movie, and I don't really see the purpose to doing it again. So yeah, he's locked away in the cupboard."

In February 2021, Baron Cohen revealed he intended to retire the character of Borat because of risks to his personal safety, feeling anxious over the March for Our Rights scene from Borat 2.

Notes

References

Further reading
Home of the official watch party and afterparty with DJ Shkoyach
Johnny the Monkey site, with a fictional filmography
"Will Sacha Baron Cohen's Borat Sequel Arrive Before the Election?" from Vanity Fair
"Sacha BaronCohen: We Must Save Democracy from Conspiracies", an editorial in Time that BaronCohen wrote, explaining the urgency of standing up against authoritarianism and populist conspiracy fear-mongering
"On the Porch: Hay House Mayhem" in the Monroe County Reporter
"Borat v Trump: Can Entertainment Really Affect an Election?" from The Guardian
A Borat in-character Reddit AMA
Alan Smith discussing his appearance in the film
"What's Real in Borat2" from Salon.com

External links

 
 Script 

2020 comedy films
2020 directorial debut films
2020 films
2020s mockumentary films
Amazon Studios films
American black comedy films
American comedy films
American coming-of-age films
American mockumentary films
American parody films
American political satire films
American satirical films
American sequel films
Best Musical or Comedy Picture Golden Globe winners
British black comedy films
British comedy films
British coming-of-age films
British mockumentary films
British parody films
British political satire films
British satirical films
British sequel films
Films about the COVID-19 pandemic
Films about sexism
Films scored by Erran Baron Cohen
Films set in 2019
Films set in 2020
Films set in Georgia (U.S. state)
Films set in Kazakhstan
Films set in Los Angeles
Films set in Maryland
British films set in New York City
Films set in Sydney
Films set in Texas
Films set in Washington (state)
Films set in Wuhan
Films shot in Dallas
Films shot in Georgia (U.S. state)
Films shot in Los Angeles
Films shot in Maryland
Films shot in New York City
Films shot in Oklahoma
Films shot in Romania
Films shot in South Carolina
Films directed by Jason Woliner
Films with screenplays by Dan Mazer
Films with screenplays by Dan Swimer
Films with screenplays by Jena Friedman
Films with screenplays by Peter Baynham
Films with screenplays by Sacha Baron Cohen
Mike Pence
Parodies of Donald Trump
Rudy Giuliani
Bioterrorism in fiction
Golden Raspberry Award winning films
Films shot in Washington (state)
Films about Holocaust denial
Films about father–daughter relationships
Amazon Prime Video original films
2020s English-language films
COVID-19 pandemic in the United States in popular culture
2020s American films
2020s British films
Da Ali G Show